The Kerin Ministry was the 70th ministry of the Government of South Australia, led by Rob Kerin, 43rd  Premier of South Australia and leader of the South Australian Branch of the Liberal Party. It commenced on 22 October 2001, when Kerin succeeded John Olsen as Liberal leader and Premier.

First formation

Second formation

Kerin made a major reshuffle of the ministry on 4 December 2001, following the resignations of a number of ministers. Trevor Griffin and Robert Lawson left the ministry, while two new members were added to cabinet, Caroline Schaefer and Martin Hamilton-Smith. This allowed him to reshape his ministry in the lead up to the 2002 Election.

See also
Cabinet of South Australia

References

South Australian ministries